Sriwedari is the fifth studio album by the Indonesian pop group Maliq & D'Essentials. The album was released on 25 January 2013 by their own independent company, Organic Records, and was produced by Eki Puradiredja. It is their first album with keyboardist Ilman Ibrahim, who joined the band in 2011. Two editions were released: a standard edition and a limited edition  of 2000 copies sold through Blibli.com.

The album was nominated for "Album of the Year" at the 1st Indonesian Choice Awards, but lost to Raisa's Heart to Heart.

Background
After releasing their compilation album Radio Killed The TV Star in 2012, the group planned to make a greatest hits album with an additional three new songs. In the end they wrote 10 new songs, and decided to create a new album.

Track listing
Music and lyrics by Maliq & D'Essentials unless otherwise stated.

Awards and nominations

Personnel
Maliq & D'Essentials
Angga Puradiredja - vocals
Indah Wisnuwardhana - vocals
Widi Puradiredja - drums
Dendy "Javafinger" Sukarno - bass
Arya "Lale" Aditya - guitar
Ilman Ibrahim - keyboards

Additional musicians
Reza Jozef "Rejoz" Patty - percussion
Amar Ibrahim - trumpet, flugelhorn
Henricus - tabla
Hary Wisnu Yuniarta - flute, oboe

Production
Eki "EQ" Puradiredja - producer
Widi Puradiredja - producer, mixing, engineer
Dendy "Javafinger" Sukarno - mixing, engineer
Geoff Pesche - mastering

References

2013 albums
Maliq & D'Essentials albums